Rondout Light is a lighthouse on the west side of the Hudson River at Kingston, New York.

Nomenclature
The official name in the Coast Guard Light List is Rondout Creek Leading Light.
The National Register name, Kingston/Rondout 2 Lighthouse comes from its location in a series of day beacons and lights in Rondout Creek.  Number 2 is the first on the right hand side.
The USCG history site calls it Rondout Creek (Kingston) Light.

History
The first lighthouse at the entrance to the Rondout Creek was a wooden one built in 1837. It was replaced by a second lighthouse, made of sturdier bluestone, in 1867. The bluestone lighthouse was abandoned after 1915 and torn down in the 1950s. Only its circular stone foundation remains today.

The current lighthouse was built in 1915, replacing the earlier 1867 lighthouse.  In 1954 the light was automated and the building closed. The National Historic Lighthouse Preservation Act provides for the Coast Guard to declare some lighthouses surplus, and for their ownership to be transferred to historical, non-profit or local government entities following an application process and review.  Nine lighthouses were identified in the fall of 2001 as part of a pilot program to transfer such lighthouses.  Rondout Light was one of those nine.  Rondout Light was transferred from the Coast Guard to the City of Kingston in 2002.  It is currently managed by the non-profit Hudson River Maritime Museum.

It was listed on the National Register of Historic Places in 1979.

References

Lighthouses completed in 1938
Houses completed in 1938
Lighthouses completed in 1915
Houses completed in 1915
Lighthouses on the National Register of Historic Places in New York (state)
Hudson River
Kingston, New York
National Register of Historic Places in Ulster County, New York
Transportation buildings and structures in Ulster County, New York
Rondout Creek